Mickey's House of Villains (also known as House of Mouse: The Villains) is a 2002 American direct-to-video animated comedy-horror film produced by Walt Disney Television Animation. It is based on the animated television series, House of Mouse and serves as a stand-alone sequel to the direct-to-video animated film Mickey's Magical Christmas: Snowed in at the House of Mouse, starring Mickey Mouse, Donald Duck, Minnie Mouse, Goofy, Daisy Duck, and Disney Villains that have appeared in past Disney productions. It was released on both VHS and DVD by Walt Disney Home Entertainment on September 3, 2002.

Plot
It is Halloween night at the House of Mouse and a lot of villains are showing up. Jafar has a trick in store for the usual heroes, but the villains have to wait until midnight for him to unleash it.

After a series of cartoons, Jafar, along with Captain Hook, Cruella de Vil, Ursula, Kaa, the Queen of Hearts, Hades, among other villains joining Jafar's plan, take over the house with the musical number "It's Our House Now!". The heroes, princesses, and other characters are trapped in the kitchen while Mickey and several others are thrown out into the street. They witness the House of Mouse's name being changed to the House of Villains.

Mickey, Donald and Goofy try to take their House back, but Chernabog stops them from entering the building. Minnie makes her attempt after the second-to-last cartoon but is casually thrown out by Hook. After the last cartoon, Mickey dresses in his sorcerer outfit from The Sorcerer's Apprentice and challenges Jafar to a magical duel using fireballs. Just when Mickey's sorcerer hat is knocked off, Aladdin evades from the kitchen on the magic carpet and gives Daisy Duck his lamp. Daisy hands it to Mickey, causing most of the villains to flee before Jafar and the rest of the villains are sucked into the lamp. The other characters are freed and the House of Villains is sabotaged, as the House of Mouse is returned to normal.

Cast 
 Wayne Allwine & Walt Disney (archival footage) as Mickey Mouse
 Russi Taylor as Minnie Mouse
 Bill Farmer & Pinto Colvig (archival footage) as Goofy/Pluto
 Jason Marsden as Max Goof
 Tony Anselmo & Clarence Nash (archival footage) as Donald Duck, Huey, Dewey and Louie
 Tress MacNeille as Daisy Duck/The Queen of Hearts/The Fates/Si and Am
 Jonathan Freeman as Jafar
 Gilbert Gottfried as Iago
 Corey Burton as Captain Hook/Chernabog
 Susanne Blakeslee as Cruella de Vil
 Pat Carroll as Ursula
 Rob Paulsen as Hades
 Bobcat Goldthwait as Pain
 Matt Frewer as Panic
 Lois Nettleton as Maleficent
 John Cleese (archival footage) as the Narrator (Mickey's Mechanical House)
 Jim Cummings as Pete/Big Bad Wolf/Kaa
 Scott Weinger as Aladdin
 April Winchell (archival footage) as Clarabelle Cow
 Rod Roddy as Mike

Cartoons
(shown in sequential order)
 Trick or Treat (1952)
 Mickey's Mechanical House (1999)
 How to Haunt a House (1999)
 Lonesome Ghosts (1937)
 Dance of the Goofys (1999)
 Donald Duck and the Gorilla (1944)
 Donald's Halloween Scare (2000)
 Hansel and Gretel (1999)

In addition, certain pieces of animation in the House segments are recycled from the series' episodes "Halloween with Hades" and "House Ghosts".

Production
Mickey's House of Villains was produced by Walt Disney Television Animation, with animation production by Toon City Animation and additional animation production by Walt Disney Feature Animation Florida.

See also
 "Our Unsung Villains" (1956)
 "Disney's Greatest Villains" (1977)
 "Halloween Hall o' Fame" (1977)
 "A Disney Halloween" (1981)
 "Disney's Halloween Treat" (1982)
 "A Disney Halloween" (1983)
 "Scary Tales" (1986, varies)
 Once Upon a Halloween (2005)

References

External links

 
 
 

2002 films
Animated films based on animated series
2002 animated films
2002 direct-to-video films
2000s American animated films
2002 comedy films
American children's animated comedy films
American sequel films
Animated crossover films
American children's animated fantasy films
Disney direct-to-video animated films
Children's horror films
Donald Duck films
American films about Halloween
2002 horror films
Films based on television series
Goofy (Disney) films
Mickey Mouse films
Films scored by Michael Tavera
American supernatural horror films
American animated horror films
Disney Television Animation films
Films with screenplays by Jymn Magon
2000s children's animated films
2002 comedy horror films
Films directed by Bobs Gannaway
Films directed by Tony Craig (director)
Films directed by Rick Calabash
Films with screenplays by Henry Gilroy
Films directed by Jamie Mitchell (director)
2000s English-language films